Double Bayou is an  unincorporated community in Chambers County, Texas, United States.

Education
The Anahuac Independent School District operates schools in the area.

External links

Unincorporated communities in Chambers County, Texas
Unincorporated communities in Texas
Greater Houston
Galveston Bay Area